Yussuf Khamis (born 13 August 1964) is a Tanzanian ACT Wazalendo politician and Member of Parliament for Nungwi constituency since 2010.

References

Living people
1964 births
Civic United Front MPs
Tanzanian MPs 2010–2015
Lumumba Secondary School alumni
Zanzibari politicians
Alliance for Change and Transparency politicians